This article contains information about the literary events and publications of 1961.

Events
January 24 – The American dramatist Arthur Miller and the film star Marilyn Monroe are granted a divorce in Mexico on grounds of incompatibility.
February – Sylvia Plath suffers a miscarriage. Several of her poems, including "Parliament Hill Fields", address the event.
March 15 – Hugh Wheeler's comedy Big Fish, Little Fish opens at the ANTA Theater in New York City, directed by Sir John Gielgud. It is one of the early Broadway plays to explore frankly the issue of male homosexuality.
March 20 – The Shakespeare Memorial Theatre, Stratford-upon-Avon, becomes the Royal Shakespeare Theatre and its company the Royal Shakespeare Company, with Peter Hall as director.
May – Grove Press publishes Henry Miller's Tropic of Cancer in the United States 27 years after its original publication in France. The book leads to one of many obscenity trials (Grove Press, Inc., v. Gerstein) that test American laws on pornography in the 1960s.
May 27 – The British bookseller WHSmith closes the last of its in-store circulating library branches.
August 8 – The first issue of Fantastic Four, by Stan Lee and Jack Kirby, is published. It is considered the beginning of the post-World War II Marvel Comics line of superhero comic books.
August 18 – The British magazine Tribune publishes a letter from playwright John Osborne beginning "Damn You, England..."
September 8 – Publication of the science fiction novel series Perry Rhodan, der Erbe des Universums, originally written by K. H. Scheer and Walter Ernsting, is begun by Arthur Moewig Verlag in Germany in Romanhefte (partwork) format. It is then published every week, attaining more than 2880 issues and around two billion total copies sold worldwide by the end of 2016.
September 14 – Novelist William Golding, having resigned a teaching post at Bishop Wordsworth's School in Salisbury, sets off for the academic year 1961/1962 to teach at Hollins College, Virginia, United States.
November 10 – Joseph Heller's satirical novel Catch-22 is first put on sale by Simon & Schuster in the United States, after favorable advance reviews in October. Heller has been working on the book since 1953, based on his experiences as a bombardier during World War II. Its title, which becomes a phrase referring to a no-win situation, had previously been Catch-18.
unknown date – Michael Halliday publishes a seminal paper on the systemic functional grammar model.

New books

Fiction
Brian Aldiss – The Primal Urge
Poul Anderson – Three Hearts and Three Lions
J. G. Ballard – The Wind From Nowhere
James Barlow – Term of Trial
Sheila Burnford – The Incredible Journey
Morley Callaghan – A Passion in Rome
John Dickson Carr – The Witch of the Low Tide: An Edwardian Melodrama
Jean Cau – The Mercy of God
Henry Cecil – Daughters in Law
Sid Chaplin – The Day of the Sardine
James Hadley Chase – A Lotus for Miss Quon
Agatha Christie
Double Sin and Other Stories
The Pale Horse
A. J. Cronin – The Judas Tree
Jennifer Dawson – The Ha-Ha
 Cecil Day-Lewis – The Worm of Death
L. Sprague de Camp – The Dragon of the Ishtar Gate
R. F. Delderfield – Stop at a Winner
August Derleth – The Reminiscences of Solar Pons
Cyprian Ekwensi – Jagua Nana
Ian Fleming – Thunderball (based on screen treatment by Kevin McClory, Jack Whittingham and the author)
Gillian Freeman (as Eliot George) – The Leather Boys
Gabriel García Márquez – No One Writes to the Colonel (El coronel no tiene quien le escriba)
Martyn Goff – The Youngest Director
 Richard Gordon – Doctor on Toast
Edward Gorey (as Ogdred Weary) – The Curious Sofa. A Pornographic Tale
Winston Graham – Marnie
Vasily Grossman – Everything Flows (Все течет; first published 1989)
Harry Harrison – The Stainless Steel Rat
Robert A. Heinlein – Stranger in a Strange Land
Joseph Heller – Catch-22
Marlen Haushofer – The Wall
Patricia Highsmith – This Sweet Sickness
Richard Hughes -The Fox in the Attic
 Michael Innes – Silence Observed
James Kennaway – Household Ghosts 
Ismith Khan – The Jumbie Bird
Margaret Laurence – The Stone Angel
John le Carré – Call for the Dead
Stanisław Lem – Solaris
Audrey Erskine Lindop – The Way to the Lantern
H. P. Lovecraft – The Shunned House
 Ross Macdonald – The Wycherly Woman
Compton Mackenzie – Mezzotint
Gladys Mitchell – The Nodding Canaries
Iris Murdoch – A Severed Head
V. S. Naipaul – A House for Mr. Biswas
R. K. Narayan – The Man-Eater of Malgudi
Juan Carlos Onetti – El astillero (The Shipyard)
Walker Percy – The Moviegoer
Emeric Pressburger – Killing a Mouse on Sunday
Caradog Prichard – Un Nos Ola Leuad (One Moonlit Night)
Harold Robbins – The Carpetbaggers
J. D. Salinger – Franny and Zooey
Leonardo Sciascia – Il giorno della civetta
Muriel Spark – The Prime of Miss Jean Brodie
Howard Spring – I Met a Lady
John Steinbeck – The Winter of Our Discontent
Irving Stone – The Agony and the Ecstasy
Rex Stout – The Final Deduction
Theodore Sturgeon – Some of Your Blood
Jun'ichirō Tanizaki (谷崎 潤一郎) – The Diary of a Mad Old Man (瘋癲老人日記)
Leon Uris – Mila 18
Rose Valland – Le Front de l'art
H. Russell Wakefield – Strayers from Sheol
Edward Lewis Wallant – The Pawnbroker
Evelyn Waugh – Unconditional Surrender
Morris West – Daughter of Silence
Angus Wilson – The Old Men at the Zoo
Richard Yates – Revolutionary Road

Children and young people
Rev. W. Awdry – Branch Line Engines (sixteenth in The Railway Series of 42 books by him and his son Christopher Awdry)
Roald Dahl – James and the Giant Peach
L. Sprague de Camp – non-fiction
The Heroic Age of American Invention
Man and Power: The Story of Power from the Pyramids to the Atomic Age
Barbara C. Freeman – Two-Thumb Tom
Rumer Godden – Miss Happiness and Miss Flower
René Goscinny and Albert Uderzo – Asterix the Gaul (Astérix le Gaulois)
Maria Gripe – Josephine
Norton Juster – The Phantom Tollbooth
Bill Peet – Huge Harold
Kin Platt – The Blue Man
Wilson Rawls – Where the Red Fern Grows
George Selden – The Cricket in Times Square (first in an unnamed sequence of seven books)
Dr. Seuss – The Sneetches and Other Stories
Elizabeth George Speare – The Bronze Bow
John Rowe Townsend – Gumble's Yard
Tomi Ungerer – The Three Robbers

Drama
John Barton – The Hollow Crown (anthology)
Samuel Beckett
Happy Days
Rough for Radio I
Rough for Radio II
Emilio Carballido – Un pequeño día de ira
Spiro Çomora – Karnavalet e Korçës (Carnival at Korçë)
Henry Denker – A Far Country
Friedrich Dürrenmatt – The Physicists (Die Physiker)
Max Frisch – Andorra
Jean Genet – The Screens (Les Paravents)
Girish Karnad – Yayati
Heiner Müller – Die Umsiedlerin (The Resettler Woman)
Tom Murphy – A Whistle in the Dark
John Osborne – Luther
Neil Simon – Come Blow Your Horn
John Whiting – The Devils
Tennessee Williams – The Night of the Iguana
Wu Han – Hai Rui Dismissed from Office (海瑞罢官, Hǎi Ruì bà guān)

Poetry

August Derleth editor – Fire and Sleet and Candlelight

Non-fiction
Alison Adburgham – A Punch History of Manners and Modes, 1841–1940
Wayne C. Booth – The Rhetoric of Fiction
E. H. Carr – What Is History?
Frantz Fanon – The Wretched of the Earth (Les Damnés de la Terre)
Fritz Fischer – Griff nach der Weltmacht: Die Kriegzielpolitik des kaiserlichen Deutschland 1914–1918
Georges Friedmann – The Anatomy of Work (English translation)
Ernest K. Gann – Fate Is the Hunter
Jane Jacobs – The Death and Life of Great American Cities
Richard Foster Jones – Ancients and Moderns: A Study of the Rise of the Scientific Movement in Seventeenth Century England
Theodora Kroeber – Ishi in Two Worlds
R. D. Laing – Self and Others
John C. Lilly – Man and Dolphin
Marshall McLuhan – The Gutenberg Galaxy: The Making of Typographic Man
Louis Nizer – My Life in Court
Karl Popper – The Poverty of Historicism
Anant Priolkar – The Goa Inquisition
Maxime Rodinson – Muhammad
Bertrand Russell – Has Man a Future?
Colin Turnbull – The Forest People
Webster's Third New International Dictionary
Theodore H. White – The Making of the President 1960
Raymond Williams – The Long Revolution
Peter Wessel Zapffe – Indføring i litterær dramaturgi (Introduction to literary dramaturgy)

Births
January 8 – Arnaldur Indriðason, Icelandic crime novelist
January 11 – Jasper Fforde, English fantasy novelist
January 12 – Simon Russell Beale, Malaysian-born English Shakespearean actor
January 28 – Arnaldur Indridason, Icelandic writer
May 4 – Ishita Bhaduri, Indian poet and writer
May 17 – Han Dong, Chinese poet and novelist
May 19 – Jennifer Armstrong, American children's author
May 22 – Andrea Dunbar, English playwright (died 1990)
June 9 – Aaron Sorkin, American screenwriter, producer and playwright
June 23 – David Leavitt, American novelist
June 24 – Rebecca Solnit, American writer and essayist
July 7 – Eric Jerome Dickey, American writer
July 10 – Carol Anne Davis, Scottish crime writer
July 18 – M. J. Alexander, American author and photographer
July – Richard Flanagan, Australian novelist
August 20 – Greg Egan, Australian science fiction author
September 13 – Tom Holt, English historical and comic novelist and poet
September 26 – Will Self, English novelist, political commentator and broadcaster
October 5 – Sílvia Soler, Catalan writer and journalist
October 29 – Michael Gurr, Australian playwright (died 2017)
November 9 – Jackie Kay, Scottish poet and novelist
November 14 – Jurga Ivanauskaitė, Lithuanian writer (died 2007)
November 18 – Steven Moffat, Scottish TV writer
November 24 – Arundhati Roy, Indian writer and activist
November – Sarah Holland, English novelist, actress and singer
December 8 – Ann Coulter, American author
November 20 – David Mills, American journalist and TV writer (died 2010)
December 23 – Ezzat el Kamhawi, Egyptian novelist and journalist
December 30 – Douglas Coupland, Canadian author
unknown date – Winsome Pinnock, British playwright

Deaths
January 10 – Dashiell Hammett, American crime writer and screenwriter (lung cancer, born 1894)
January 21 – Blaise Cendrars (Frédéric-Louis Sauser), Swiss novelist and poet (born 1887)
January 30 – Dorothy Thompson, American journalist (born 1893)
February 4 – Hazel Heald, American pulp fiction writer (born 1896)
March 18 – E. Arnot Robertson, English novelist (born 1903)
April 9 – Oliver Onions (George Oliver), English novelist and ghost story writer (born 1873)
April 22 – Joanna Cannan, English pony book writer and detective novelist (born 1896)
April 30 – Jessie Redmon Fauset, American editor, writer and educator (born 1882)
May 26 – William Troy, American writer and teacher (cancer, born 1903)
June 2 – George S. Kaufman, American dramatist and critic (born 1889)
June 15 – Peyami Safa, Turkish journalist and writer (born 1899) 
July 1 – Louis-Ferdinand Céline, French novelist and pamphleteer (born 1894)
July 2 – Ernest Hemingway, American novelist (suicide, born 1899)
July 12 – Mazo de la Roche, Canadian novelist (born 1879)
July 17 – Olga Forsh, Russian dramatist, novelist and memoirist (born 1873)
August 14 – Clark Ashton Smith, American writer (born 1893)
August 18 – Leonhard Frank, German writer (died 1882)
September 27 – H.D. (Hilda Doolittle), American poet, novelist and memoirist (born 1886)
October 19 – Mihail Sadoveanu, Romanian novelist (born 1880)
November 2 – James Thurber, American humorist (born 1894)
December 7 – Roussan Camille, Haitian poet and journalist (born 1912)
December 26 – Gertrude Minnie Faulding, English children's writer and novelist (born 1875)

Awards
Carnegie Medal for children's literature: Lucy M. Boston, A Stranger at Green Knowe
Eric Gregory Award: Adrian Mitchell, Geoffrey Hill
Formentor Prize: Jorge Luis Borges and Samuel Beckett
James Tait Black Memorial Prize for fiction: Jennifer Dawson, The Ha-Ha
James Tait Black Memorial Prize for biography: M. K. Ashby, Joseph Ashby of Tysoe
Lorne Pierce Medal: Robertson Davies
Miles Franklin Award: Patrick White, Riders in the Chariot
Newbery Medal for children's literature: Scott O'Dell, Island of the Blue Dolphins
Nobel Prize in Literature: Ivo Andrić
Premio Nadal: Juan Antonio Payno, El curso
Prix Goncourt: Jean Cau, La Pitié de Dieu
Pulitzer Prize for Drama: Tad Mosel, All the Way Home
Pulitzer Prize for Fiction: Harper Lee, To Kill a Mockingbird
Pulitzer Prize for Poetry: Phyllis McGinley, Times Three: Selected Verse From Three Decades
National Book Award for Fiction: Conrad Richter, The Waters of Kronos
National Book Award for Nonfiction: William L. Shirer, The Rise and Fall of the Third Reich
National Book Award for Poetry: Randall Jarrell, The Woman at the Washington Zoo: Poems and Translations

References

 
Years of the 20th century in literature